Slutterhouse is a Lebanese electropop duo based in Beirut and Paris. It was formed in 2006 by singer and songwriter Rabih Salloum and producer Nabil Saliba. The duo itself described its music as a "crossover between underground electronica, mainstream club music, and rock n’ roll".

The group's first album, Made in Dance, was released in September 2009 and was met with critical praise by both the international press and audience.

A remix EP of the single "Inside the Station" was released in digital stores worldwide on April 15, 2010.

On November 14, 2011, Slutterhouse released the single, "Stop Me", and their second album, Another Lie, was released on December 30, 2011.

Slutterhouse split up a year later. Saliba went to develop his electronic solo project Al Rajul Al Hadidi. Salloum retired from music before coming back with his solo debut EP Before the Rain in September 2018.

Discography 
Made in Dance (2009)
Another Lie (2011)

References

External links 
 Slutterhouse Official Website
 Slutterhouse MySpace Page
 OurStage Profile

Lebanese pop music groups
Musical groups established in 2006
Musical groups disestablished in 2012